Sonrise is the debut studio album from the Norwegian Christian metal band Schaliach. It was released in 1996 through Petroleum Records to a mostly positive critical reception. In particular, the guitar work from Ole Børud was praised. In 2005, Momentum Scandinavia re-issued the album with an additional track - "Purple Filter", that originally appeared on a compilation album.

Style and lyrics 
The style performed by Schaliach was variously described as doom metal, death metal, death-doom, Gothic metal, black metal, melodic death metal, and progressive metal. The guitar playing by Ole Børud — likened to a "metal symphony" — is strongly influenced by classical music and was compared to that of Metallica as well as Dream Theater, Threshold, Shadow Gallery, and Teramaze. The instrumental track "Coming of the Dawn" is accompanied by piano and string instruments. The overall sound of the album was described as similar to Amorphis.

The lyrics on the album are explicitly Christian, drawing heavily from the Bible and referencing Christ and the love of God for all of humanity. "You Maintain" is written from the perspective of God pleading with an unbeliever, and "A Father's Morning" from the perspective of God speaking to a wayward Christian. Though an instrumental, "In Memoriam" is dedicated to unborn children who were aborted.

Critical reception 

Sonrise was received very well by most critics. Alex Cantwell from Chronicles of Chaos described the record as "excellent doom with a distinct Norwegian flavour." HM writer Matt Morrow in their review of the 2005 re-issue rated the album 90/100 and called the album a "classic". They expressed the opinion that while Sonrise "may not have been the best the genre has ever seen, but the emotion that a band with a brutally heavy sound and growled vocals could convey was quite impressive." Josh Spencer from The Phantom Tollbooth rated that album four-and-a-half out of five, calling the duo "astounding!" While they felt that the production value and overall sound was not at the same level as Amorphis's Tales From the Thousand Lakes, it was great enough for them. Shari Lloyd, also of The Phantom Tollbooth, said that they were not disappointed, and they gave the album a four out of five. Lloyd stated that though growled vocals are not usually their style, on Sonrise they did not mind them since the music was the main focus. Rock Hard was far less favorable to the album, rating it 4/10. They considered Schaliach boring and that the sound on the album was muffled and mashed together.

Track listing

Personnel 
 Peter Dalbakk - vocals, rhythm guitar on "A Whisper from Heaven" and "Coming of the Dawn"
 Ole Børud - guitar, bass, drums, additional vocals

Additional personnel
 Øyvind Å. Berg - piano, strings
 Schaliach - production
 Fred Dalbakk - co-production
 Jeff - mastering

References 

Schaliach albums
1996 debut albums